A suction trap is a machine that uses air to suck liquid or mucus. It is widely used to extract mucus from recently born babies that are unable to do it by themselves.

Tools
Babycare